Dames is a surname. Notable people with the surname include:

Danie Dames (born 1986), Namibian rugby union player
Rob Dames (born 1944), American writer, director and producer
Romi Dames (born 1979), American actress
Rory Dames, American soccer coach
Wilhelm Dames (1843–1898), German palaeontologist

See also
Dame (surname)